Shelestovo is a rural locality (a selo) and the administrative center of Shelestovskoye Rural Settlement, Oktyabrsky District, Volgograd Oblast, Russia. The population was 910 as of 2010. There are 10 streets.

Geography 
Shelestovo is located 39 km east of Oktyabrsky (the district's administrative centre) by road. Goncharovka is the nearest rural locality.

References 

Rural localities in Oktyabrsky District, Volgograd Oblast